The Blues Giant (also known as Stone Crazy!) is the fourth studio album by Buddy Guy.

History 
The 1970s was a very hard time for traditional blues musicians. Only one Buddy Guy studio album had been released in that decade (Hold That Plane! - recorded in 1969, released in 1972), until he and his band entered Concoret Studios in Toulouse, France for these sessions. Guy was pleased to record with French producer Didier Tricard. To release this album, Tricard founded a new label, which Guy named "Isabel" after his mother.

Recordings 
On October 31, 1979, Guy and his band recorded 13 songs (for two different albums). One of them was this album, the other one was the Junior Wells album  Pleading the Blues (Wells only played on the tracks for his album, but the band is the same on both albums).

Guy's brother Phil played rhythm guitars, J. W. Williams played bass, Ray "Killer" Allison played drums.
"Are You Losing Your Mind" is a version of Guy's earlier song "Stone Crazy", retitled due to copyright issues at the time.

Releases 
Originally released on the French label Isabel in 1979 as The Blues Giant (in France and the U.K.), but with alternate covers.
First released in the U.S. in 1981 by Alligator Records, (retitled Stone Crazy!).
Released in Brazil in 1988 (with an alternate cover).
First released on CD in 1990 (in the U.S. by Alligator as Stone Crazy!), in the UK by Isabel (as The Blues Giant).
Released on CD in France by Isabel in 2002 as Stone Crazy!, but with an alternate cover to the U.S. release.

Track listing 
All tracks written by Buddy Guy, except "Outskirts of Town" by Casey Bill Weldon and Andy Razaf.
 "I Smell a Rat" – 9:31
 "Are You Losing Your Mind" – 6:33
 "You've Been Gone Too Long" – 5:38
 "She's Out There Somewhere" – 4:26
 "Outskirts of Town" – 8:13
 "When I Left Home" – 8:20

Personnel 
Buddy Guy – lead guitar, vocals
Phil Guy – rhythm guitar
J.W. Williams – bass
Ray Allison – drums

References 

1979 albums
Buddy Guy albums
JSP Records albums
Alligator Records albums